The 1982 Spanish motorcycle Grand Prix was the fourth round of the 1982 Grand Prix motorcycle racing season. It took place on the weekend of 21–23 May 1982 at the Circuito Permanente del Jarama.

Classification

500 cc

References

Spanish motorcycle Grand Prix
Spanish
Spanish motorcycle Grand Prix